is a stable of sumo wrestlers, part of the Dewanoumi ichimon or group of stables. It was set up in 1990 by former sekiwake Tochiazuma Tomoyori, who branched off from Kasugano stable. He coached his son, who also wrestled under the name Tochiazuma, to ōzeki rank. Tamanoi reached retirement age in September 2009, and was succeeded by his son. As of January 2023, the stable had 21 wrestlers, two of them being a sekitori.

The stable is based in Nishiarai in Tokyo's Adachi ward, and built new premises in 2004, 10 minutes from the old location. In December 2011 Tamanoi-oyakata and wrestlers from the stable assisted the police by starting street crime prevention patrols in the local area in the run up to the New Year celebrations.

In September 2020 nineteen members of the stable tested positive for COVID-19, after a lower ranked wrestler became ill. Every wrestler at the stable was prevented from participating in the September tournament.

Ring name conventions
Many wrestlers at this stable have taken ring names or shikona that include the character 東 (read: azuma or tō) meaning east, in deference to their coach and the stable's owner, the former Tochiazuma, as well as his father, the founder. It can also be used as a prefix, as in Azumaryū and Azumasato, as well as a suffix as in Yoshiazuma and Fujiazuma.

Owners
2009–Present: 13th Tamanoi Daisuke (fuku-riji, former ōzeki Tochiazuma Daisuke)
1990-2009: 12th Tamanoi Tomoyori (former sekiwake Tochiazuma Tomoyori)

Notable active wrestlers

Azumaryū (best rank maegashira)
Fujiazuma (best rank maegashira)
Tōhakuryū (best rank, jūryō)
Yoshiazuma (best rank maegashira)

Assistant
 (sewanin, former jūryō, real name Eiryū Idokawa)

Referees
Kimura Yukihiro (jūryō referee, real name Yukihiro Fukunaga)

Usher
Shunsuke (makushita yobidashi, real name Satoru Watanabe)

Hairdresser
Tokotsuka (2nd class tokoyama)
Tokotama (5th class tokoyama)

Location and access
Tokyo, Adachi ward, Nishiarai 4-1-1
10 minute walk from Nishiaraidaishi-nishi Station on the Nippori-Toneri Liner

See also
List of sumo stables
List of active sumo wrestlers
List of past sumo wrestlers
Glossary of sumo terms

References

External links
Official site 
Facebook site 
Japan Sumo Association profile
Tamanoi blog

Active sumo stables